Étienne Roussy is a Canadian cinematographer. He is most noted for his work on the film Gulîstan, Land of Roses (Gulîstan, terre de roses), for which he won the Prix Iris for Best Cinematography in a Documentary at the 19th Quebec Cinema Awards in 2017.

He has also been a three-time Canadian Screen Award nominee for Best Cinematography in a Documentary.

He is an alumnus of the Université du Québec à Montréal.

Filmography

Awards

References

External links

Canadian cinematographers
French Quebecers
Université du Québec à Montréal alumni
Living people